The Shire of Diamond Valley was a local government area about  northeast of Melbourne, the state capital of Victoria, Australia.

History

The name relates to the lowlands to the west of Diamond Creek, a tributary of the Yarra River, which flows through nearby Eltham.

The Diamond Valley can be defined in geographical terms as the area bounded by the Plenty River, the Yarra, the Christmas Hills ridge to the east and the Great Dividing Range to the north.

Land in the area was first incorporated as part of the Heidelberg Road District on 12 October 1860, which became a shire on 27 March 1864, and was proclaimed as the City of Heidelberg on 11 April 1934. On 30 September 1964, the North Ward of the City of Heidelberg was severed, and incorporated as the Shire of Diamond Valley.

In 1863, the Diamond Reef was discovered by Thomas Wright Soady on Dr John Blakemore Phipps property, which stretched from Reynold's Road to the Diamond Creek.

On 15 December 1994, the Shire of Diamond Valley was abolished; areas south of the Metropolitan Ring Road and the Greensborough Highway merged with the City of Heidelberg, into the newly created City of Banyule, while areas north were merged with parts of the City of Whittlesea and the Shire of Eltham, into the newly created Shire of Nillumbik. A small area in the shire's southwest, north of La Trobe University and including the Gresswell Forest Nature Reserve, was transferred to the City of Darebin.

Council met at the Diamond Valley Civic Centre, in Civic Circuit, Greensborough. The facility is still used by the Shire of Nillumbik.

Wards

The Shire of Diamond Valley was divided into four ridings, each of which elected three councillors:
 South West Riding
 South East Riding
 Centre Riding
 North Riding

Suburbs
 Briar Hill (shared with the Shire of Eltham)
 Bundoora (shared with the Cities of Preston and Whittlesea)
 Diamond Creek
 Eltham North
 Greensborough*
 Hurstbridge (shared with the City of Whittlesea and Shire of Eltham)
 Macleod (shared with the City of Heidelberg)
 Plenty
 St Helena
 Watsonia
 Watsonia North
 Wattle Glen (shared with the Shire of Eltham)
 Yarrambat

* Council seat.

Population

* Estimate in the 1958 Victorian Year Book.
# The Shire of Diamond Valley was created in 1964. Source of population: 1968 Victorian Year Book.

References

External links
 Victorian Places - Diamond Valley Shire

Diamond Valley
City of Banyule
1964 establishments in Australia
1994 disestablishments in Australia
Shire of Nillumbik